On 10 December 2003, paratroopers from 3rd Brigade, 82d Airborne Division with the assistance of Iraqi police conducted Operation Panther Squeeze. The operation was part of the Iraq War.

Operation
Operation Panther Squeeze was a series of 18 raids in Lutafiyah to kill or capture individuals believed to be responsible for the attack against Spanish forces on 29 November.

During the raids, 15 primary targets were captured with a total of 41 enemy personnel taken for questioning. Those captured included the cell leader Abu Abdullah, an intelligence officer, financier, and a doctor who treated terrorists so they can avoid treatment at local hospitals, and the actual attackers.

A vehicle was also confiscated that may have been used in the recent assassination of the Lutafiyah police chief.

American units
3rd Brigade, 82d Airborne Division
1st Brigade, 1st Infantry Division

Iraqi units
Iraqi Police

See also
List of coalition military operations of the Iraq War

References

External links
Defend America News

Military operations of the Iraq War involving the United States
Military operations of the Iraq War involving Iraq
Military operations of the Iraq War in 2003
Iraqi insurgency (2003–2011)